Azin Alizadehasl (Persian: آذین علیزاده اصل, born 1975) is an Iranian Professor of Cardiology, Echocardiologist and CardioOncologist.
She is currently the pioneer and head of Cardio-Oncology department and research center and faculty member of Rajaie Heart Center in Tehran, Iran.She is also fellowship of American Society of Echocardiography, Member at Large positions on ASE Guidelines and Standards Committee till 2020 and fellowship of American College of Cardiology.

Early life 
Azin Alizadehasl born on 1975 in Urmia, Iran. She is an Iranian Professor of Cardiology, Echocardiologist and CardioOncologist.
She is currently the pioneer and head of Cardio-Oncology department and research center in Rajaie Heart Center in Tehran, Iran. She is also fellowship of American Society of Echocardiography. She studied in General medicine in Tabriz University of Medical Sciences from 1993 to 2000, She also holds Board certified in cardiology from Iran and Tabriz University of Medical Sciences.
Alizadehasl ranked second (silver medal) in world Olympiad of Chemistry in Italy (February 1992); ranked second in Cardiovascular Residency Program Exam in IRAN at 2002 and ranked as first 10% of Iranian Cardiology Board exam at 2006. She got International Doody’s Core Titles Award for Practical Cardiology Book and Book-authority selected author for 100 Best Cardiology Books of All Time

Career  
Alizadeasl was the founder of the first cardio-oncology clinic and department in Iran at Shaheed Rajaie Cardiovascular Medical and Research Center that was the first cardio-oncology clinic, educational and research center, in the Middle East. She is also author and editor of numerous national and international books with valuable publishing companies such as Elsevier, Springer, Cambridge and Jaypee. She has an innovation in Echocardiography field with name of HOLTER ECHOCARDIOGRAPHY and also accepted innovation with name of A Polypill for prevention of cardiotoxicity including Carvedilol, Lisinopril, Aldactone and Atorvastatin by research deputy of  Iranian ministry of health and also accepted innovation with name of TEE probe surface modification by preventing adhesion of macromoleculars ( Saliva).

Bibliography 
Some books written by Alizadehasl: 

 Comprehensive Approach to Adult Congenital Heart Disease, Springer Publishing Company; Anita Sadeghpour, Majid Kiavar, Azin Alizadehasl. 2014
 Multimodal Imaging Atlas of Cardiac Masses, Elsevier Publishing Company, Azin Alizadehasl and Majid Maleki, In press, 2022
 Practical Cardiology Principles and Approaches, Elsevier Publishing Company, Majid Maleki, Azin Alizadehasl, Majid Haghjoo, 2017
 Chemotherapy Cardiovascular Considerations; Drug Manual, Azin Alizadehasl, Mohammad Vaezi, Ehsan Ferasati, … et al. 1400.
 Color Atlas of Cardiology- Challenging Cases, Jaypee Publishing Company. 2017, Majid Maleki, Azin Alizadehasl.
 Case based textbook of Echocardiography, Springer UK, Anita Sadeghpour, Azin Alizadehasl. 2018
 Practical Cardiology Principles and Approaches, 2nd Edition, Elsevier Publishing Company, Majid Maleki, Azin Alizadehasl, Majid Haghjoo, 2021
 Cardiac radiation toxicity: clinical and practical point, Azin Alizadehasl et al, 1400
 Atlas of Echocardiography in Pediatrics and Congenital Heart Diseases
 Case-Based Clinical Cardiology

References

1975 births
Iranian oncologists
Academic staff of Tabriz University of Medical Sciences
Living people